Dunggir is a national park located in New South Wales, Australia,  northeast of Sydney. It features the Kosekai Lookout, offering a view of the Nambucca Valley. Dungir (Gumbaynggirr) means "koala".

The park is home to twelve endangered animal species, 400 indigenous plants and three types of rainforest.

See also
 Protected areas of New South Wales

References

External links
 Dunggir National Park official web site

National parks of New South Wales
Protected areas established in 1997
1997 establishments in Australia